Mecklenburg-Vorpommern (MV;), also known by its anglicized name Mecklenburg–Western Pomerania, is a state in the north-east of Germany. Schwerin is the state capital and Rostock is the largest city. Other major cities include Neubrandenburg, Stralsund, Greifswald, Wismar, and Güstrow. It was named after the 2 regions of Mecklenburg and Vorpommern (which means West Pomerania).

The state was established in 1945 after World War II through the merger of the historic regions of Mecklenburg and the Prussian Western Pomerania by the Soviet military administration in Allied-occupied Germany. It became part of the German Democratic Republic in 1949, but was dissolved in 1952 during administrative reforms and its territory divided into the districts of Rostock, Schwerin, and Neubrandenburg. A state called in German Mecklenburg-Vorpommern was re-established in 1990 following German reunification and became one of the new states of the Federal Republic of Germany.

On the state's coastline on the Baltic Sea are many holiday resorts and much unspoilt nature, including the islands of Rügen, Usedom, and others, as well as the Mecklenburg Lake District, making the state one of Germany's leading tourist destinations.  Three of Germany's fourteen national parks, as well as several hundred nature conservation areas, are in the state.  The University of Rostock, founded in 1419, and the University of Greifswald, established in 1456, are among the oldest universities in Europe. In 2007, the 33rd G8 summit took place at the Grand Hotel Heiligendamm on the Mecklenburg Baltic coast during the chancellorship of Angela Merkel, a native of Mecklenburg-Vorpommern.

Name
Due to its lengthy name, the state is often abbreviated as MV or (colloquially) shortened to MeckPomm. In English, it is usually named as "Mecklenburg-Western Pomerania". Inhabitants are called either Mecklenburger or Pomeranians, the combined form is never used. 
The full name in German is pronounced . Sometimes, Mecklenburg is pronounced , because the digraph  marks a preceding short vowel in High German. However, Mecklenburg is within the historical Low German language area, and the  appeared in its name during the period of transition to Standard, High German usage (Low German authors wrote the name Meklenborg or Męklenborg, depicting proper Low German pronunciation, which itself was a syncope of Middle Low German Mekelenborg). Another explanation is that the  comes from a mannerism in High German officialese of writing unnecessary letters, a so-called Letternhäufelung (as was done sometimes in English with words such as "doubt"). The place name Vorpommern, at its base derives from West Slavic languages, with the prefix "po-" meaning along or at, and the base word "more" meaning sea — together "po more" means Land at the Sea — while the German prefix "vor-" denoted a closer location, and is the equivalent of the word "hither" in English.

History

In the aftermath of the Second World War and German reunification in 1990, the state was constituted from the historic region of Mecklenburg and Western Pomerania, both of which had long and rich independent histories.

Prehistory

Human settlement in the area of modern Mecklenburg and Vorpommern began after the Ice Age, about 10,000 BC. About two thousand years ago, Germanic peoples were recorded in the area. Most of them left during the Migration Period, heading towards Spain, Italy, and France, leaving the area relatively deserted. In the sixth century Polabian Slavs populated the area. While Mecklenburg was settled by the Obotrites, Pomerania was settled by the Veleti (later Liuticians) and the Rani.

Along the coast, Vikings and Slavs established trade posts like Reric, Ralswiek and Menzlin. In the 12th century, Mecklenburg and Vorpommern were conquered by Henry the Lion and incorporated into the Duchy of Saxony, joining the Holy Roman Empire in the 1180s. Parts of Mecklenburg and Pomerania were settled with Germans in the Ostsiedlung process, starting in the 12th century.

Mecklenburg

In the late 12th century, Henry the Lion, Duke of the Saxons, conquered the Obotrites, subjugated its Nikloting dynasty, and Christianized its people. In the course of time, German monks, nobility, peasants and traders arrived to settle here. After the 12th century, the territory remained stable and relatively independent of its neighbours; one of the few German territories for which this is true. Mecklenburg first became a duchy of the Holy Roman Empire in 1348. Though later partitioned and re-partitioned within the same dynasty, Mecklenburg always shared a common history and identity. The states of Mecklenburg-Schwerin and Mecklenburg-Strelitz became Grand Duchies in 1815, and in 1870 they voluntarily joined the new German Empire, while retaining their own internal autonomy. After the First World War and the abdication of the German Kaiser, the monarchies of the duchies were abolished and republican governments of both Mecklenburg states were established, until the Nazi government merged the two states into a unified , a virtually meaningless administrative decision under the centralised regime.

Western Pomerania

Vorpommern, literally Fore-Pomerania, is the smaller, western part of the former Prussian Province of Pomerania; the eastern part became part of Poland after the end of World War II.

In the Middle Ages, the area was ruled by the Pomeranian dukes as part of the Duchy of Pomerania. Pomerania was under Swedish rule after the Peace of Westphalia from 1648 until 1815 as Swedish Pomerania. Pomerania became a province of Prussia in 1815 and remained so until 1945.

Mecklenburg-Vorpommern

Wartime
In May 1945, the armies of the Soviet Union and the Western allies met east of Schwerin. Following the Potsdam Agreement, the Western allies handed over Mecklenburg to the Soviets. Mecklenburg-West Pomerania was established on 9 July 1945, by order No. 5 of Red Army Marshal Georgy Zhukov, head of the Soviet Military Administration in Germany (SMAD), as the Province of Mecklenburg and West Pomerania (zapadnoi Pomeranii).

During the war, the make-up of Mecklenburg and Vorpommern's population changed, due to wartime losses and the influx of evacuees (mainly from the Berlin and Hamburg metropolitan areas that were subject to air raids). After the war, people who fled and were expelled from the former eastern territories of Germany east of the Oder-Neisse line settled in Mecklenburg-Vorpommern (and elsewhere in Germany), increasing the population by 40%. Before the war, Mecklenburg and Western Pomerania had a population of 1,278,700, of whom many perished during the war and others moved west in the course of the Red Army's advance. In 1947, some 1,426,000 refugees from the former eastern parts of Germany were counted. Most of them settled in rural communities, but the urban population also increased, most notably in Schwerin from 65,000 (1939) to 99,518 (January 1947), in Wismar from 29,463 to 44,173, and in Greifswald from 29,488 to 43,897. Western Pomerania was additionally stripped of the area around the Pomeranian regional capital Stettin/Szczecin as well as the city itself, despite its location to the west of the river Oder.

German Democratic Republic

On 5 June 1946, a law enacted by the Soviets constituted a provisional German administration (Beratende Versammlung) under Soviet supervision on 29 June 1946. After elections on 20 October 1946, a Landtag replaced the Beratende Versammlung and created the constitution of 16 January 1947, for the Land Mecklenburg-Vorpommern. On 18 April 1947, the state's name was shortened to Land Mecklenburg. Mecklenburg became a constituent state ("Land") of the German Democratic Republic (GDR) upon its formation in 1949. In 1952, the East German government abandoned the term Land in this context and redesignated its administrative territorial divisions as "districts" (German: Bezirke). The territory of Mecklenburg and Vorpommern was divided into three districts that covered roughly the same area: Bezirk Rostock, Bezirk Schwerin and Bezirk Neubrandenburg. These were commonly known as the Nordbezirke (northern districts) under the highly centralised GDR government. The East German government developed the shipyards in the old Hanseatic ports (the largest being in Rostock and Stralsund), and also established the Greifswald Nuclear Power Plant in Lubmin near Greifswald.

Reunification
At the time of German reunification in 1990, the eastern states were reconstituted along their postwar boundaries (with minor adjustments) as they had existed until 1952, and the historic name Mecklenburg-Vorpommern was restored. Since 1990, the state has undergone dramatic changes. What had been largely an industrial and agricultural economy is increasingly driven by the service, tourism, and high-tech sectors. The old towns, hundreds of castles and manors, resort buildings, windmills, churches, and various other cultural monuments of Mecklenburg-Vorpommern have been renovated in recent years. Since 2013, net migration into the state has been positive again.

Geography

Location and urban areas

Sixth-largest in area and fourteenth in overall population among Germany's sixteen Bundesländer (federal states), Mecklenburg-Vorpommern is bounded to the north by the Baltic Sea, to the west by Schleswig-Holstein, to the southwest by Lower Saxony, to the south by Brandenburg, and to the east by the West Pomeranian Voivodeship in Poland.

Mecklenburg-Vorpommern's state capital is Schwerin. The largest city is Rostock with approximately 205,000 people, followed by Schwerin. Other major cities include Neubrandenburg, Stralsund, Greifswald, Wismar and Güstrow.

Districts

Since 4 September 2011, Mecklenburg-Vorpommern is divided into six Kreise (districts):

 Landkreis Rostock
 Ludwigslust-Parchim
 Mecklenburgische Seenplatte
 Nordwestmecklenburg
 Vorpommern-Greifswald
 Vorpommern-Rügen
Also counting two independent urban districts:
 Rostock (HRO)
 Schwerin (SN)

Landscape
Mecklenburg-Vorpommern's varied coastline also has many peninsulas such as Fischland-Darß-Zingst and various lagoons (also known as Bodden or Haff).

A total of 283 nature reserves, 110 landscape reserves and three of Germany's fourteen national parks are scattered all over the state.

Lakes

The southern part of the state is characterized by a multitude of lakes within the Mecklenburg Lakeland, the largest of which is Lake Müritz (also the largest German lake), followed by Lake Schwerin, Plauer See and Lake Kummerow. The "land of a thousand lakes" (German: Land der tausend Seen) is hallmarked by its unspoilt nature. Due to its clean air and idyllic setting, medical tourism has become a notable tourism sector in the region.

National parks

Culture
Over the centuries, Mecklenburg and Vorpommern have developed and maintained strong regional cultures. It can generally be described as North German and has similar linguistic and historic characteristics to other north German states, such as Schleswig-Holstein. People in Vorpommern, as a result of that territory being a former province of Prussia, tend to look slightly more towards Berlin and Brandenburg than people in Mecklenburg would.

Architecture
The cities are characterised by a certain "Hanseatic" style also found in other parts of northern Germany (e.g. Lübeck) as well as in countries bordering the Baltic Sea like Estonia (e.g. Tallinn) or Latvia (e.g. Riga). A common feature of many towns in Mecklenburg and Vorpommern are red Brick Gothic churches and houses dating back to the Middle Ages. Also stepped and tailed gables are a typical feature of the Hanseatic old towns, such as Stralsund, Wismar and Greifswald.

The old towns are usually built around one or several market places with a church or the town hall. Often towns were founded at the Baltic Sea, one of the many lakes or a river for logistical and trade motives.

Rural areas of Mecklenburg-Vorpommern are often characterized by Brick Gothic village churches and agricultural heritage, like brick homesteads, thatched roof houses, windmills, manor houses and castles.

Museums, art and theatres

The largest publicly funded theatres in the state are the Mecklenburg State Theatre, the Rostock People's Theatre, the Theatre of West Pomerania, with venues in Stralsund, Putbus and Greifswald, and the Mecklenburg State Theatre of Neustrelitz with venues in Neubrandenburg and Neustrelitz. All four theatres offer both drama and musical theatre as well as orchestral music.
Other important theatres are the Ernst Barlach Theatre of Güstrow, the Theatre of Parchim, the Anklam Theatre and the Wismar Theatre.
There are also many small theatres on the Baltic coast and in individual artist's villages and resorts (e.g. the popular concert pavilions at the Baltic Sea). Since its growing importance for summer tourism, open-air theatres and festivals become more common again as well, such as the Störtebeker Festival on the island of Rügen, and the Vineta Festival on Usedom.

Since 1993, the Störtebeker Festival has taken place in Ralswiek on the island of Rügen. It is Germany's most successful open-air theatre.

Notable museums include, for example, the Schwerin State Museum and the Pomeranian State Museum at Greifswald. The German Oceanographic Museum with its Ozeaneum in Stralsund is the most popular museum in northern Germany. Furthermore, the German Amber Museum in Ribnitz-Damgarten, Rostock's Abbey of the Holy Cross and Rostock Art Gallery are of national importance. The oldest museum in Mecklenburg-Western Pomerania is Stralsund's Cultural History Museum, the smallest is the Professor Wandschneider Sculpture Museum in Plau am See.

Mecklenburg-Vorpommern is home to many cultural events throughout the year. During summer, many open-air concerts and operas are open to visitors. The Mecklenburg-Vorpommern Festival (Festspiele Mecklenburg-Vorpommern) attracts a sizeable audience by performing classical concerts in parks, churches and castles.

Caspar David Friedrich, a famous romanticist painter born in Greifswald, immortalised parts of the state in several of his paintings.

Language

Today the vast majority of people speak Standard German; a few centuries ago most people spoke Low German (German: Plattdeutsch or Niederdeutsch), a language that is still kept alive within various communities and cultural events.

Food and drinks

Like most German regions, Mecklenburg and Vorpommern have their own traditional dishes, often including fish, beef and pork. Rostock has its own type of bratwurst called Rostocker Bratwurst. A famous dish from Western Pomerania is Bismarck Herring. Rote Grütze is a popular dessert. The largest beer breweries are Mecklenburgische Brauerei Lübz (Lübzer Pils), Hanseatische Brauerei Rostock, Darguner Brauerei and Störtebeker Braumanufaktur (Stralsund, multiple winner of the World Beer Cup). Besides, there are many smaller breweries and craft beer variations, such as the Mellenthin Castle Beer from Usedom Island.

Religion

As of 2020, the majority (82.4%) of the citizens of Mecklenburg-Western Pomerania are not religious or adhere to other religions. 14.2% are members of the Evangelical Church in Germany and 3.4% of the Catholic Church.

Following the Reformation, led in Germany by Martin Luther, as well as a period of Swedish rule, the traditional faith in Mecklenburg-Vorpommern is Protestantism, specifically Lutheranism. There are also a number of Catholics and people of other faiths.

In May 2012 the Evangelical Lutheran Church of Mecklenburg merged with North Elbian Evangelical Lutheran Church and Pomeranian Evangelical Church into the new Evangelical Lutheran Church in Northern Germany.
Some parishes of the state belong to Evangelical Church of Berlin and Brandenburg.

There are also Jewish communities, in the state capital of Schwerin (including Wismar) and in the city of Rostock. Historically, there were also synagogues in smaller towns, of which some are still preserved (like Röbel, Krakow am See and Boizenburg). The state's Jewish organisation is part of the Central Council of Jews in Germany.

Immigration
Largest immigrant communities:

Vital statistics
Births from January to September 2016 =  10,224
Births from January to September 2017 =  9,836
Deaths from January to September 2016 =  15,251
Deaths from January to September 2017 =  15,532
Natural growth from January to September 2016 =  5,027
Natural growth from January to September 2017 =  5,696

Education

Universities and colleges

Mecklenburg-Vorpommern has the two oldest universities of the Baltic Sea region, also among the oldest of Germany and all of Europe:
University of Greifswald (established 1456)
University of Rostock (established 1419)

Also, there are further colleges / technological universities:
 Fachhochschule des Mittelstands (FHM) in Rostock and Schwerin (private)
 Rostock University of Music and Theatre
 Hochschule Wismar (University of Applied Sciences: Technology, Business and Design)
 Fachhochschule Stralsund (University of Applied Sciences)
 Hochschule Neubrandenburg (University of Applied Sciences)
 Fachhochschule für öffentliche Verwaltung, Rechtspflege und Polizei Güstrow (University of Administration, Judicature and Police in Güstrow)
 Hochschule der Bundesagentur für Arbeit with its Schwerin campus
 DesignSchule Schwerin with options to study design (private; game/fashion/media/web design)

Schools
The state's school system is centralised. There are two main types of schools, Regionalschule (for the majority of pupils) and Gymnasium (for the top 30% of each year's students, leading to the university entrance qualification "Abitur"). Besides, there are also independent schools, comprehensive schools and trade schools.

Politics

Article 20 of the State Constitution states that the Landtag is the "site of political decision-making". The Mecklenburg-Vorpommern Landtag is elected democratically by the citizens of the state and sits for a 5-year legislative period. The seat of the Landtag is located at Schwerin Palace in Schwerin. The essential functions of the Landtag are to elect the Minister-President of the state; to discuss and decide on laws which have been proposed by the government, by any four members of the Landtag, or a people's initiative or petition for a referendum initiated directly by the people; and to control the state government.

Minister-President

The executive is led by a cabinet, in turn led by a Minister-President, who is the official head of state and government. The election to determine the Minister-President is held no later than four weeks after the newly elected Landtag is convened.

Landtag

The last election of the Landtag of Mecklenburg-Vorpommern took place on 26 September 2021. The SPD won a landslide plurality of almost 40% of votes, a nine percentage point increase from 2016. The opposition Alternative for Germany (AfD) remained the second largest party but declined to under 17%. The CDU recorded its worst ever result in the state with 13.3%, while The Left also declined to 10%. Alliance 90/The Greens and the Free Democratic Party (FDP) both won around 6% of votes and re-entered the Landtag after previously falling out in 2016 and 2011, respectively.

The Landtag has been led by Minister President Manuela Schwesig since 2017.
On 13 October 2021, Schwesig announced the SPD would enter coalition talks with The Left. She stated her motivations for reorienting the coalition as a desire for "a new departure", and described The Left as a "social, pragmatic party" with decisive policy overlap with the SPD. She said that The Left had been a reliable partner to the government even while in opposition, and had assumed "state-political responsibility" during the COVID-19 pandemic.

On 5 November 2021, the SPD and The Left agreed to a coalition government and plan to form a cabinet, which is to be approved by each party-congress by mid-November.

Economy
The gross domestic product (GDP) of the state was 44.5 billion euros in 2018, accounting for 1.3% of German economic output. GDP per capita adjusted for purchasing power was 25,400 euros or 84% of the EU27 average in the same year. The GDP per employee was 83% of the EU average. The GDP per capita was the lowest of all German states.

Labour market
Mecklenburg-Vorpommern is the least densely populated and least industrial German state, being the sixth largest in area, but only the 14th in population. Formerly, unemployment has been negatively affected by the breakdown of non-competitive former GDR industries after the German reunification in the 1990s.  As of 2018 unemployment is the lowest in more than 15 years while the economy is growing and the number of jobs is increasing continually. Growing sectors are biotechnology, information technology, life sciences, maritime industry and tourist services.

In Mecklenburg-Vorpommern, approximately 732,200 people were gainfully employed in 2008 with 657,100 of them were white and blue collar workers. About 4,200 new jobs were created in 2007. Employees worked an average of 1,455 hours a year. The number of self-employed did not change in 2008. Three out of every four of all workers are employed in the service sector. In October 2018 the unemployment rate stood at 7.1% and was the third highest rate in Germany.

Tourism
Mecklenburg-Vorpommern is the top destination for intra-German tourism and is gaining importance for international tourism.
The main tourist regions are:
 Islands: Rugia and Usedom (Germany's two largest islands), Poel and Hiddensee;
 Peninsula: Fischland-Darß-Zingst (with Ahrenshoop and Zingst);
 Seaside resorts: Binz, Boltenhagen, Graal-Müritz, Heringsdorf (including Bansin and Ahlbeck), Heiligendamm, Kühlungsborn, Warnemünde and Zinnowitz;
 Stettin Lagoon: Ueckermünde;
 Hinterland: particularly the Mecklenburg Lakeland; and
 Cities: Stralsund and Wismar (both listed as UNESCO World Heritage Sites), Schwerin, Güstrow, Rostock and Greifswald, which have a diverse cultural heritage.
 Night sky: Mecklenburg-Vorpommern is home to some of the most pristine night skies in Germany, especially in the area near Nationalpark Müritz. It is a potential site for a Dark Sky Park.

As a reminder of its rich history, nearly 2,000 castles, palaces and manor houses exist in Mecklenburg-Vorpommern, many of which are used as venues for public events like concerts and festivals, such as Festpiele MV (a classical music festival).

Medical tourism based on the clean air and idyllic settings by the Baltic Sea has a growing importance to the regional tourism industry.

Sport
Main sporting attractions include the German football league games of F.C. Hansa Rostock and the international sailing event Hanse Sail. If the bid for the 2012 summer Olympics in Leipzig had been successful, the sailing competitions would have taken place off the coast of Rostock.

Notable people

Notable from Mecklenburg-Vorpommern include:

 Arts: Ernst Barlach, Friedrich von Flotow, Caspar David Friedrich, Marianne Hoppe, Till Lindemann, Philipp Otto Runge
 Business: Ernst Heinkel, Carl Heinrich von Siemens, Leonhard Tietz, Georg Wertheim
 Literature: Ernst Moritz Arndt, John Brinckman, Hans Fallada, Walter Kempowski, Fritz Reuter, Rudolf Tarnow, Ehm Welk
 Politics: Ernst Moritz Arndt, Dietmar Bartsch, Joachim Gauck, Egon Krenz, Gebhard Leberecht von Blücher, Angela Merkel, Helmuth von Moltke the Elder, Harald Ringstorff
 Science: Theodor Billroth, Friedrich Chrysander, Walther Flemming, Gottlob Frege, Otto Lilienthal, Gustav Mie, Ferdinand von Mueller, Paul Pogge, Carl Wilhelm Scheele, Heinrich Schliemann, Johannes Stark
 Sports: Tim Borowski, Andreas Dittmer, Thomas Doll, Carsten Jancker, Marita Koch, Toni Kroos, Sebastian Sylvester, Jan Ullrich, Jens Voigt

Miscellaneous

 Mecklenburg-Vorpommern is Germany's number-one tourist location, the main destinations being the Baltic Sea coastline with islands such as Rügen or Usedom, spa towns like Heiligendamm, Kühlungsborn, Boltenhagen or Warnemünde and the Mecklenburg Lake District. It also offers important historical cities, such as Stralsund, Wismar, Greifswald and Rostock as former Hanseatic cities − or Schwerin, Güstrow, Ludwigslust and Neustrelitz as former residences.
 The first rockets to reach outer space were launched in 1944 during World War II in Peenemünde on the present-day territory of Mecklenburg-Vorpommern.
 During the chancellorship of Angela Merkel, Mecklenburg-Vorpommern hosted the first official public meeting with President George W. Bush in 2006 and the 33rd G8 summit in 2007. Both political events were financed by state and federal budgets.

Gallery

See also

 History of Pomerania
 List of places in Mecklenburg-Vorpommern
 List of towns in Vorpommern
 Mecklenburg
 Pomerania

References

External links

 Official Mecklenburg-Vorpommern portal
 

Tourism
 Off to MV - Official tourism website of Mecklenburg-Vorpommern
 Germany.Travel - Federal Tourism Association: Mecklenburg-Vorpommern

 
1946 establishments in Germany
NUTS 1 statistical regions of the European Union
States and territories established in 1946
States of Germany